The Union Street–Academy Hill Historic District makes up most of downtown Montgomery, New York, United States. It abuts the smaller Bridge Street Historic District to the northwest. The district has been on the National Register of Historic Places since November 21, 1980.

The district is roughly bounded by Hanover Street, one block west of Union Street (NY 211), Ward Street (NY 17K) on the north, Wallkill Avenue to the east and Sears Street to the south. The 300-acre (1.2 km2) rectangle-shaped historic district contains 83 buildings, many of them houses that date to the early and mid-19th century and exemplify popular contemporary architectural styles.

  The centerpiece of the historic district is the Village Hall, the former Montgomery Academy, which dates to the 1830s. Its location on a slight rise gave its name to the rise and, later, the historic district.

See also
National Register of Historic Places listings in Orange County, New York

Notes

External links

National Register of Historic Places in Orange County, New York
Historic districts on the National Register of Historic Places in New York (state)
Historic districts in Orange County, New York